The Newport 27S is an American sailboat that was designed by C&C Design as a cruiser and first built in 1974.

Production
The design was built by Capital Yachts in Harbor City, California, United States, starting in 1974, but it is now out of production.

Design
The Newport 27S is a recreational keelboat, built predominantly of fiberglass, with wooden trim. It has a masthead sloop rig, a raked stem plumb stem, a plumb transom, an internally mounted spade-type rudder controlled by a tiller and a fixed fin keel. It displaces  and carries  of ballast.

A tall mast was optional, with a mast that was about  higher, for sailing in areas with lighter winds.

See also
List of sailing boat types

References

External links
Photo of a Newport 27S

Keelboats
1970s sailboat type designs
Sailing yachts
Sailboat type designs by C&C Design
Sailboat types built by Capital Yachts